Alexander Alden is an American diplomat who was the acting Assistant Secretary of State for Conflict and Stabilization Operations from December 22, 2020, until January 2021 after having served as Deputy Assistant Secretary in the Bureau of Europe and Eurasian Affairs.  Alden was transferred to that position after having worked as director for defense policy and strategy for the National Security Council.

Education
Alden earned a M.A. in political science from the Johns Hopkins University and a B.A. in political science and philosophy from Southern Illinois University.

References

Living people
Johns Hopkins University alumni
Southern Illinois University alumni
21st-century American diplomats
United States Assistant Secretaries of State
United States National Security Council staffers
Year of birth missing (living people)